Edward Seymour Trim (6 November 1907 – 22 April 1989) was an Australian rules footballer who played with Footscray in the Victorian Football League (VFL).

Notes

External links 
		

1907 births
1989 deaths
Australian rules footballers from Victoria (Australia)
Western Bulldogs players
Prahran Football Club players